Park Lane Halt railway station was an unadvertised halt which served the communities of Bickershaw and Abram southeast of Wigan, England.

Location and nearby stations
The station was on the Wigan Junction Railways line, known locally as the "Wigan Central line", which ran from Wigan Central to Glazebrook. It was situated immediately south of the level crossing by which Park Lane crossed the tracks. The word "Halt" in a station name usually implied that it was unstaffed.

Services
The service patterns remain the subject of research. Authoritative printed and on line works on the route make no direct mention of the halt, though one does include an extract of a 1926 OS map on which the halt appears. It is possible that some service trains made unadvertised calls, but more likely that all 3rd Class unadvertised workmen's trains called. No published extracts from Bradshaw, nor the 1922 version makes any mention of the halt.

An image of a printed Great Central Railway ticket issued to a "Workman" from Park Lane Halt to Wigan Central has been published. This implies the halt was opened before 1 January 1923 when the Great Central ceased to exist as a separate entity.

The halt is named on OS maps between 1926 and 1952, not before and not after. This latest mention date does not confirm the halt was still open then.

Opening, naming and closure
The line opened in 1884 and closed to passengers on 2 November 1964, closing completely in 1968. The track through the site of the halt was subsequently lifted.

Afterlife
In 2015 the trackbed could be identified and Park Lane itself remained as an unmade private road and bridleway. No trace of the halt survived.

References

Sources

Further reading

External links

Disused railway stations in the Metropolitan Borough of Wigan
Former Great Central Railway stations
Railway stations in Great Britain opened in 1922
Railway stations in Great Britain closed in 1941